The North of England Hard Court Championships and later known as the Wilson North of England Hard Court Tennis Championships for sponsorship reasons was a combined men's and women's clay court tennis tournament established in 1913 and ran until 1988.

History
The North of England Hard Court Championships was a combined men's and women's clay court tennis tournament first established in 1913 at the Yorkshire Lawn Tennis Club. Scarborough, Yorkshire, England. In 1956 the tournament changed location to the Argyle Lawn Tennis Club, Southport, England for the duration of its run until 1988. 

In 1941 the Argyle Lawn Tennis Club established the Southport Easter Open tournament, and from 1956 that tourment was incorporated jointly with the North of England Hard Court Championships. From 1981 to 1984 the championships were sponsored by the paint company 'Weatherall' and was known as the Weatherall North of England Hard Court Championships. In 1985 the company Wilson Sporting Goods took over sponsorship of the event and was known as Wilson North of England Hard Court Tennis Championships until 1988 then was discontinued.

Event name
 North of England Hard Court Championships (1913-1962)
 North of England Hard Court Lawn Tennis Championships (1963-1967)
 North of England Hard Court Open Championships (1968-1980)
 Weatherall North of England Hard Court Tennis Championships (1981-1984)
 Wilson North of England Hard Court Tennis Championships (1985-1988)

Locations and Venues
The championships were held at the Yorkshire Lawn Tennis Club. Scarborough, Yorkshire, England from 1913 to 1955. In 1956 event was transferred to the Southport Argyle Lawn Tennis Club, Southport, Merseyside until 1988.

See also
 North of England Championships (grass court tournament)

References

Clay court tennis tournaments
Defunct tennis tournaments in the United Kingdom